The 1998 Brent London Borough Council  election took place on 7 May 1998 to elect members of Brent London Borough Council in London, England. The whole council was up for election and the Labour party gained overall control of the council from no overall control.

Background
Before the election Labour ran the council with the support of the Liberal Democrats. However the Conservatives targeted the council with the Conservative Shadow Secretary of State for the Environment, Transport and the Regions, Norman Fowler, predicting that the Conservatives would make gains in Brent. The Conservatives required a 1% swing from the 1994 election to win a majority on the council, where previously no party had a majority.

Election result
The Labour party took a 20-seat majority on the council after gaining 15 seats, with the gains including taking all of the seats in Fryent and Roe Green wards and 1 seat in Queensbury ward from the Conservatives. The Conservatives put their defeat in Brent down to the popularity of the national Labour government and unhappiness at the closure of Edgware General Hospital's casualty department by the previous Conservative government. The Liberal Democrats failed to make gains and dropped from 5 to 4 councillors. Overall turnout at the election was 36.8%, down from 48.3% in 1994.

|}

Ward results

References

1998
1998 London Borough council elections